Colonel Napoleón Herson Calitto Arbaiza (14 December 1941 — 23 October 1984) was a distinguished commanding officer in the Salvadoran Army during the Salvadoran Civil War in the 1980s.

He was born Napoleon Herson Calitto Arbaiza in San Salvador on 14 December 1941. Calitto graduated in 1963, together with Colonel Domingo Monterrosa Barrios in the utmost elite military academy in El Salvador, Academia Militar Gerardo Barrios. He had a distinguished career and reputation during the civil war in El Salvador. On the 13 of November 1964 he became a lieutenant, his first combat assignment was as a gunman in the 2nd artillery brigade during the 1969 war against Honduras, which is also known as the "Soccer War" due to immigration problems between the two countries. He became a Lieutenant Colonel on 31 of July 1981.

Calitto and Monterrosa were seen as number ones in their class because of their superb leadership and combat skills. After graduating from the military academy, Calitto went on to take military classes from American soldiers in Panama, and later went on to Taiwan to study anti-communist insurgency tactics. Soon after his return to El Salvador in December 1981, Calitto was assigned to become the founder Commander of the elite "Atonal" Battalion, an immediate reaction battalion in the department of Usulután, where he trained what was considered one of the best military groups in El Salvador.

Calitto Arbaiza married Juanita Flores and had two sons, Herson Napoleon Calitto Jr and Ronnie Stanley Calitto. Herson Calitto Jr joined the Salvadorean army in 1983 and died in combat on 19 February 1984, when the helicopter he was traveling in was brought down by guerrilla forces. Ronnie Calitto joined the United Nations and served with the Department of Peace Keeping Operations in Liberia (UNMIL) and Sudan (UNMIS); and later he joined the UN Office for the Coordination of Humanitarian Affairs (OCHA) in Afghanistan as Humanitarian Affairs and Civil-Military Coordination Officer.

In May 1984 Colonel Calitto was made commander of the Commander and Instruction center of the Salvadorean Army, the position he held until the time of his death on 23 October 1984. Ironically, as his son, Colonel Calitto was killed while traveling in a helicopter after a FMLN bomb went off while he was on flight. The remnants of his helicopter can be found in El Museo de la Revolucion in Perquín, Morazán.

Calitto also had a daughter out of wedlock in October 1967 with Leonor Herrera, and also married Frida Larreynaga in December 1975 and had another daughter.

In 1985, the city of Usulatan named one of their main streets after him and raised a monument commemorating his life.

_

"On October 23, 1984, Lieutenant Colonel José Domingo Monterrosa Barrios, considered by members of the Salvadoran army to be one of their best strategists, was assassinated in Joateca, Department of Morazán, when the helicopter in which they were preparing to take off exploded. , the attack was awarded to him by the ERP.

Along with the commander of the Third Infantry Brigade, the commander of the San Francisco Gotera special command training center, Lieutenant Colonel Napoleón Herson Calito; the chief of operations of that same major institution Nelson Alejandro Rivas, and the commander of the Atlacatl battalion, Major José Armando Azmitia Melara, the pilot lieutenants, Airman Pilot Second Lieutenant Mauricio Antonio Duarte Arévalo; Cadet Second Lieutenant Oscar Villega Guevara; Cadet Second Lieutenant Arturo Aparicio Erazo, artillery soldiers, Manuel Gómez Martínez and Miguel Ángel Martínez; the priest Carlos René Guillén, sacristan Juan de Dios Andrade, and 3 members of the Press Committee of the Armed Forces, COPREFA: Juan Paulino Rivas, Joaquín Baltazar del Tránsito Reyes and René Mauricio Quintanilla.

Official spokespersons described the news as "tragic", not only because of the 14 lives lost, but also because of the hard blow that the guerrillas inflicted on the Salvadoran army. To replace Monterrosa at the head of the III Brigade, he appointed Lieutenant Colonel Miguel Antonio Méndez, who commanded a special battalion."

Gallery

References

External links
 https://biblioteca.utec.edu.sv/sitios/conflicto/index.php/1984/10/23/el-ejercito-de-el-salvador-pierde-a-tcnel-domingo-monterrosa/
 imagenes/Gerson calitto.html
 http://www.fuerzaarmada.gob.sv/MdnCcp/galeria%20imagenes/Imagenes-Audios.htm
 http://www.fuerzaarmada.gob.sv/MdnCcp/galeria%20imagenes/Gerson%20calitto.htm

1941 births
1984 deaths
People from San Salvador
Burials in El Salvador
Salvadoran military personnel
People of the Salvadoran Civil War